The cultural diversity and heritage in Lagos means there are quite a number of colorful cultural and traditional festivals held within the state that showcase the rich history of its people, arts, entertainment and lifestyles. According to historians, the earliest documented festival in lagos dates back to the 19th century when the first festival was staged at Oke Ipa, end of Glover Road area in Ikoyi. Ever since then, there have been several festival to celebrate culture, art and lifestyle in lagos.

Cultural themed  festival

Eyo Festival (Adamu Orisha) 
The Eyo Festival is celebrated in Lagos Island. The name Eyo is from the white-clad masquerades bearing long staffs which are the highlight of the occasion. The first noted celebration took place in 1854. Traditionally, the Eyo festival was held to escort the soul of a departed Lagos King or Chief and to usher in a new king. However, in the last 25 years, the festival has taken place three times and has been used to celebrate notable people.

Gẹlẹdẹ Festival 
The Gẹlẹdẹ festival particularly have a stronghold in the Ikorodu local government of Lagos State. It is believed that the Gẹlẹdẹ society encourages social harmony and discourages patriarchy because both men and women are involved in the society. The festival is characterized by the display of members of the society in colourful masks. They combine art and ritual dance to amuse, educate and inspire worship. The festival has been performed to better the lot of an individual, cleanse the society of pestilence, induce rain, enrich human fertility, enlist the support of supernatural forces and the “powerful mothers” in wartime, and honor the dead.

Lagos Black Heritage Festival 
The festival showcases the diversity of African culture and heritage. LBHF celebrates African creativity with diverse performances such as traditional and contemporary dance, drama, music, painting, and photography expositions among others. The Carnival afforded the diverse ethnic nationalities dwelling in the city of Lagos, an opportunity to forge a new relationship.

Arts themed festival

Lagos Book and Art Festival 
The Lagos Book and Art Festival, (LABAF)  was created in 1999 to whip up enthusiasm and support for the book as a cultural item.  Annually, there is the need to promote culture and  encourage speaking and writing in our indigenous languages in Nigeria. The Lagos Book and Art Festival is held over a seven-day period in different venues including Goethe-Institute, the British Council, and Freedom Park, all in Lagos State.

Food themed festival

Lagos Food festival 
Lagos food festival showcases the best of Nigerian Cuisine and delicacies thereby creating awareness on Nigerian's rich food culture. It celebrates the one thing that unites all Nigerians- a love for good food and drinks. This is an annual event held during the Independence Weekend holiday.

EatDrinkFestival 
The festival started in Lagos in 2015. Sterling Bank is one of its main sponsors.

GTBank Food and Drink 
GTBank Food and Drink is a multi-day annual Lagos food festival by Guaranty Trust Bank. The maiden edition was held for two days in 2016 while subsequent annual events held for four days. the festival exposés of the biggest culinary dishes and drinks experience in Africa.

Entertainment themed festival

Felabration 
Felabration is an annual music festival conceived in 1998 by Yeni Anikulapo-Kuti in memory and celebration of her father Fela Kuti, a Nigerian musician and human rights activist known for pioneering the afrobeat genre of music. The one-week-long event which is held annually at the New Afrika Shrine in Ikeja, attracts visitors from different countries and has thus been considered as an official tourist destination by the Lagos State Government.

Felabration is held on the week of Fela Kuti birthday. The event features musical performances from top music acts from Nigeria and guest appearances from internationally acclaimed musicians and personalities. It also consists of street parades, symposia on social and topical issues, debates and photo exhibitions.

The Experience Lagos 
The Experience (commonly known as The Experience Lagos is an annual, free gospel music concert held at the Tafawa Balewa Square in Lagos Island, Nigeria. Begun and hosted by House on the Rock lead pastor Paul Adefarasin in 2006, the first concert had an attendance of 70,000 people.

The concert features local and international artists such as Kirk Franklin, CeCe Winans, Donnie McClurkin, Don Moen, Frank Edwards, Nathaniel Bassey, and Chioma Jesus. The Experience is recognised as one of Africa's largest musical events. The music score and direction at the concert has been provided by Wilson Joel since 2013.

References 

Lagos
 
Festivals